Shane Alan Deitz (born 4 May 1975) is an Australian cricket coach and former player. He played first-class cricket for the Southern Redbacks as a left-handed top-order batsman and occasional wicket-keeper. He was appointed coach of the Netherlands women's national team in 2020, having previously served as head coach (and briefly playing coach) of the Vanuatu men's national team and also as CEO of Vanuatu Cricket.

Playing career 
Deitz was a promising junior cricketer, as an under-17 and under-19 representative with the New South Wales Blues. He played for the New South Wales 2nd XI early in his career but after being unable to break into the senior lineup he moved to South Australia where he made his debut in 1998–99.

Deitz would be in and out of the side during the first half of his career but finally found his feet in 2004–05. He cemented his place in the side for 2005/06 after being recalled late in the previous season and making the most of his chance with scores of 90 and 141. Despite not impressing for most of the season he made 154 against New South Wales cricket team in March 2006, which was the highest score in his career. He finished the year with 502 runs at 31.37.

He finished his career with South Australia after the 2007/08 season, at the age of 33. He scored 3753 first-class runs and averaged 30.76 in 66 first-class games, and also took 89 catches and effected six stumpings as a back-up wicket-keeper when Graham Manou was unavailable.

In September 2019, he was named in Vanuatu's squad for the 2019 Malaysia Cricket World Cup Challenge League A tournament.

Coaching career 
In 2008, he moved to New Zealand to took up a coaching job with Cricket Wellington. He was named as High Performance Manager as well as head coach of Vanuatu national cricket team in 2014.

In March 2018, after meeting the ICC residency requirements, he was named in Vanuatu's squad as both a player and the coach for the 2018 ICC World Cricket League Division Four tournament in Malaysia. At the age of 42, he made his international debut, top-scoring for Vanuatu in their opening two fixtures of the Division Four tournament. On 3 May 2018, he scored his maiden half-century, in Vanuatu's fourth match of the tournament, against Bermuda. He was the leading run-scorer for Vanuatu in the tournament, with 164 runs in five matches.

In January 2019 he retired as national coach to become CEO of Vanuatu Cricket. He was replaced as head coach by another Australian, Peter Buchanan. In December 2020, Deitz was appointed as the head coach of the Netherlands women's cricket team, the first time a full-time coach was appointed for the Dutch women's team.

References

External links
 

1975 births
Living people
South Australia cricketers
Australian cricketers
Lincolnshire cricketers
Cricketers from Sydney
Australian cricket coaches
Vanuatuan cricketers
Australian expatriate sportspeople in Vanuatu
Australian expatriates in the Netherlands
Wicket-keepers
Coaches of the Vanuatu national cricket team